Ommabad (also Romanized as Ommābād and Amābād) is a village in Qareh Poshtelu-e Pain Rural District, Qareh Poshtelu District, Zanjan County, Zanjan Province, Iran. At the 2006 census, its population was 17, in 10 families.

References 

Populated places in Zanjan County